Wesleyan Methodist Church is a historic Wesleyan church located at Seneca Falls in Seneca County, New York. It was constructed in 1843. All interior features have been removed and three original walls stand.

The church was the site of the 1848 Seneca Falls Convention, the first women's rights convention, where about 300 people gathered to hear Elizabeth Cady Stanton demand the right of women to vote.

In 1869 a section of the church broke away and established the First Congregational Church of Seneca Falls. The remaining Wesleyan congregation moved to a new location and sold the church in 1873.

It was listed on the National Register of Historic Places in 1980 and now forms part of the Women's Rights National Historic Park. Pews from the First Congregational Church are now installed in the Wesleyan church.

See also
 List of monuments and memorials to women's suffrage

References

External links

Guide to the First Wesleyan Methodist Church of Seneca Falls Records, 1843-1911 (Collection Number: 6049), Division of Rare and Manuscript Collections, Cornell University Library

Churches on the National Register of Historic Places in New York (state)
Historic American Buildings Survey in New York (state)
Methodist churches in New York (state)
Churches completed in 1843
19th-century Methodist church buildings in the United States
Churches in Seneca County, New York
1843 establishments in New York (state)
National Register of Historic Places in Seneca County, New York
Seneca Falls, New York